U-136 may refer to one of the following German submarines:

 , a Type U 127 submarine launched in 1917 and that served in the First World War until surrendered on 23 February 1919; broken up at Cherbourg in 1921
 During the First World War, Germany also had this submarine with a similar name:
 , a Type UB III submarine launched in 1918

Submarines of Germany